Digaleto is a village in the municipal unit of Sami, on the island of Kefalonia, Greece. Its population was 316 in 2011. It is situated in the saddle between the mountains Ainos and Merovougli, at 540 m elevation. It is 3 km northwest of Agios Nikolaos, 9 km east of Valsamata, 9 km northwest of Poros, 9 km southeast of Sami and 17 km east of Argostoli. The road from Sami to Poros passes through the village.

Population

See also
List of settlements in Cephalonia

References

External links
Digaleto at the GTP Travel Pages

Populated places in Cephalonia